Sarah Nagourney is an American songwriter, artist development strategist, and founder of Glassbeat Music, Inc.

Discography

References

Living people
American women singer-songwriters
Musicians from New York City
Singer-songwriters from New York (state)
Year of birth missing (living people)
21st-century American women
Singer-songwriters from Connecticut